The phylogenetic split of the superfamily Hominoidea (apes) into the Hylobatidae (gibbons) and Hominidae (great apes) families (also dubbed "gibbon–human last common ancestor", GHLCA) is dated to the early Miocene, roughly .

Hylobatidae has four gibbon genera (Hylobates with 9 species, Hoolock with 3 species, Nomascus with 7 species and Symphalangus with only 1 species)  containing 20 different species. Hominidae has two subfamilies, Ponginae (orangutans) and Homininae (African apes, including the human lineage).

Evolutionary history

A 2014 whole-genome molecular dating analysis indicated that the gibbon lineage diverged from that of great apes (Hominidae) around 17 million years ago, based on certain assumptions about the generation time and mutation rate.

The extinct Bunopithecus sericus was a gibbon or gibbon-like ape. Adaptive divergence associated with chromosomal rearrangements led to rapid radiation of the four genera within the Hylobatidae lineage between about 7 to 5 Mya. Each genus comprises a distinct, well-delineated lineage, but the sequence and timing of divergences among these genera have been hard to resolve due to radiative speciations and extensive incomplete lineage sorting.  Recent coalescent-based analysis of both the coding and noncoding parts of the genome suggests that the most likely sequence of species divergences in the Hylobatidae lineage is (Hylobates, (Nomascus, (Hoolock, Symphalangus))).

Appearance and ecology
Because fossils are so scarce, it is not clear what GHLCA looked like. A 2019 study found that the species was "smaller than previously thought" and about the size of a gibbon.

It is unknown whether GHLCA was tailless and had a broad, flat rib cage like their descendants. But it is likely that it was a small animal, probably weighing only . This contradicts previous theories that they were the size of chimpanzees and that apes moved to hang and to swing from trees to get off the ground because they were too big. There might have been an arms race in brachiating to reach the best food. Also, the Hominidae, which came later, were smaller than their ancestors, which is contrary to normal evolution where animals get larger over their evolutionary development.

References

See also

 Chimpanzee–human last common ancestor
 Gorilla–human last common ancestor
 Orangutan–human last common ancestor
 History of hominoid taxonomy
 List of human evolution fossils (with images)

Human evolution
 Last common ancestors
Events in biological evolution